Kenneth Green (27 April 1924 – 7 June 2001) was an English footballer who played as a full back. He played for Birmingham City from 1943 to 1959, making 443 appearances in all competitions and scoring 3 goals, and played in the 1956 FA Cup final which Birmingham lost to Manchester City 3–1. He earned two England B caps in 1954, and was subsequently named in the full England squad which travelled to Switzerland for the 1954 FIFA World Cup. However, he never made a senior appearance for England. Green died in Sutton Coldfield in 2001 at the age of 77.

Honours
Birmingham City
 Football League Second Division runner-up: 1947–48, 1954–55
 FA Cup finalist: 1955–56

References

1924 births
2001 deaths
Footballers from West Ham
English footballers
England B international footballers
Association football fullbacks
Birmingham City F.C. players
English Football League players
English Football League representative players
1954 FIFA World Cup players
FA Cup Final players